Tapsell may refer to:

Surname 
Phillip Tapsell (1777–1873), born Hans Homan Jensen Falk, Danish mariner, whaler, and trader who settled in New Zealand
Enid Marguerite Hamilton Tapsell (1903–1975), New Zealand nurse, community leader, writer, local politician
Wally Tapsell (1904–1938), British communist activist, leading figure in the British Battalion during the Spanish Civil War
Carlyle Tapsell (1909–1975), Indian field hockey player and twice Olympic competitor
Peter Tapsell (British politician) (1930–2018), Conservative Party politician, former Member of Parliament
Peter Tapsell (New Zealand politician) (1930–2012), Speaker of the New Zealand House of Representatives
R. F. Tapsell (1936–1984), English author of historical novels, editor of a book on royal family dynasties
Miranda Tapsell (born 1987), Indigenous Australian actress of both stage and screen
Tania Tapsell, New Zealand politician

Places 
Tapsell Foreland, snow-covered foreland jutting into the sea between Yule Bay and Smith Inlet, northern Victoria Land